The buff-banded rail (Hypotaenidia philippensis) is a distinctively coloured, highly dispersive, medium-sized rail of the rail family, Rallidae. This species comprises several subspecies found throughout much of Australasia and the south-west Pacific region, including the Philippines (where it is known as tikling), New Guinea, Australia, New Zealand (where it is known as the banded rail or moho-pererū in Māori), and numerous smaller islands, covering a range of latitudes from the tropics to the Subantarctic.

Description

It is a largely terrestrial bird the size of a small domestic chicken, with mainly brown upperparts, finely banded black and white underparts, a white eyebrow, chestnut band running from the bill round the nape, with a buff band on the breast.  It utilises a range of moist or wetland habitats with low, dense vegetation for cover.  It is usually quite shy but may become very tame and bold in some circumstances, such as in island resorts within the Great Barrier Reef region.

The buff-banded rail is an omnivorous scavenger which feeds on a range of terrestrial invertebrates and small vertebrates, seeds, fallen fruit and other vegetable matter, as well as carrion and refuse.  Its nest is usually situated in dense grassy or reedy vegetation close to water, with a clutch size of 3–4.  Although some island populations may be threatened, or even exterminated, by introduced predators, the species as a whole appears to be safe and its conservation status is considered to be of Least Concern.

Evolution
Numerous subspecies are recognised for the buff-banded rail because of repeated dispersion of birds to islands in the Pacific, often followed by founder effects and reduced potential for gene flow. The weka in New Zealand evolved from a lineage with common ancestry to modern buff-tailed banded rail populations, and has changed over time to become flightless.

Subspecies
Described subspecies include:

Gallery and media

See also

References

External links
 
 

buff-banded rail
Birds of Malesia
Birds of Oceania
Least concern biota of Oceania
buff-banded rail
buff-banded rail
Articles containing video clips
Birds of the Philippines